Dąbrówka Bytowska is a non-operational PKP railway station in Dąbrówka Bytowska (Pomeranian Voivodeship), Poland.

Lines crossing the station

References 
Dąbrówka Bytowska article at Polish Stations Database, URL accessed at 29 March 2006

Railway stations in Pomeranian Voivodeship
Disused railway stations in Pomeranian Voivodeship
Bytów County